Igors Savčenkovs (born 3 November 1982 in Ventspils) is a Latvian professional football defender, currently playing for FK Jelgava in the Latvian Higher League.

His previous clubs were FK Ventspils, Dinaburg Daugavpils, Skonto Riga, Daugava Daugavpils and Torpedo Kutaisi.

References

External links

1982 births
Living people
People from Ventspils
Latvian people of Russian descent
Latvian footballers
FK Ventspils players
FK Jelgava players
Dinaburg FC players
Skonto FC players
FC Daugava players
FC Torpedo Kutaisi players
Latvian expatriate footballers
Expatriate footballers in Georgia (country)
Latvia international footballers

Association football defenders